The second USS Snapper (SP-2714) was a United States Navy patrol vessel in commission from 1918 to 1919.

Snapper was built as a gasoline-powered commercial fishing boat of the same name in 1906 by T. E. Tull at Pocomoke City, Maryland. On 14 September 1918, the U.S. Navy purchased her at Norfolk, Virginia, from W. S. Webber of Norfolk for use as a section patrol boat during World War I. She was commissioned at Norfolk as USS Snapper (SP-2714) on 5 October 1918.

Assigned to the 5th Naval District, Snapper served on patrol duty in Hampton Roads and the Virginia Capes area through the end of World War I.

Snapper was sold to the Neptune Line of New York City on 11 September 1919.

References
 
 SP-2714 Snapper at Department of the Navy Naval History and Heritage Command Online Library of Selected Images: U.S. Navy Ships: -- Listed by Hull Number: "SP" #s and "ID" #s -- World War I Era Patrol Vessel and other Acquired Ships and Craft numbered from SP-2700 through SP-2799
 NavSource Online: Section Patrol Craft Photo Archive Snapper (SP 2714)

Patrol vessels of the United States Navy
World War I patrol vessels of the United States
Ships built in Pocomoke City, Maryland
1906 ships